A Gamble with Hearts is a 1923 British silent crime film produced by Master Films, directed by Edwin J. Collins and starring Milton Rosmer, Madge Stuart, and Olaf Hytten. The film was adapted from a novel by Anthony Carlyle.

Cast
 Milton Rosmer - Dallas Chalfont 
 Madge Stuart - Morag Lannon 
 Olaf Hytten - Dallas Junior 
 Valia - Rosaleen Erle 
 George Bishop - Inspector Duer 
 Margaret Hope - Fanette Fraser 
 Cecil Morton York - Vickers 
 Mickey Brantford 
 C. Hargrave Mansell
 Pat Fitzgerald

References

External links
 

1923 films
1923 crime films
British silent feature films
Films based on British novels
Films directed by Edwin J. Collins
British black-and-white films
British crime films
1920s English-language films
1920s British films